Mariano Lautaro Latorre Court (4 January 1886 – 10 November 1955) was a Chilean writer of Basque descent. He won the Chilean National Prize for Literature in 1944.

Works
Notable works:
 Cuentos del Maule (1912)
 Cuna de Cóndores (1918)
 Zurzulita (1920)
 Ully (1923)
 Chilenos del Mar (1929)
 On Panta (1935)
 Hombres y Zorros (1937)
 La Literatura de Chile (1941)
 Mapu (1942)
 Viento de Mallines (1944)
 El Choroy de Oro (1946)
 Chile, País de Rincones (1947)
 El Caracol (1952)
 La Paquera (1958)
 La Isla de los Pájaros (1959)
 Memorias y otras confidencias (published in 1971)

References

1886 births
1955 deaths
Chilean male writers
Chilean people of Basque descent
National Prize for Literature (Chile) winners